Southern Angami I is one of the 60 Legislative Assembly constituencies of Nagaland state in India. It is part of Kohima District and is reserved for candidates belonging to the Scheduled Tribes. It is also part of Nagaland Lok Sabha constituency.

Members of Legislative Assembly

Election results

2018

See also 
 List of constituencies of the Nagaland Legislative Assembly
 Southern Angami II Assembly constituency

References

Kohima district
Assembly constituencies of Nagaland